Breathless is a 2009 novel by American author Dean Koontz. It was published by Bantam Books on November 24, 2009.

References

Novels by Dean Koontz
2009 American novels